David Harry Walker  (9 February 1911 – 5 March 1992) was a Scottish-born Canadian novelist. He was born in Dundee, Scotland, later moving to St Andrews, New Brunswick, Canada, where he began his career as a writer. His work has been made into films.

Biography

David Walker was born near Dundee, Scotland and received his early education in Shrewsbury, later enrolling at the Royal Military College, Sandhurst. After graduation in 1931, he was commissioned in the Black Watch. He served with the foreign battalion in India and Sudan (1932–38) and in Canada (1938–39) as aide-de-camp to Governor-General Lord Tweedsmuir, the novelist John Buchan.

There he met Willa Magee of Montreal, and they married on 27 July 1939. The couple had four sons together: Giles, Barclay, David, and Julian.

In September 1939, amid the threat of war, Walker returned to England, where he trained recruits. The next year he was posted to France with The Black Watch 51st Highland Division. Captured by the Germans at St. Valery in June 1940, he spent nearly 5 years in prisoner of war camps, escaping three times; each time he was recaptured after getting outside the camp. While interned at Colditz Castle, he began to write poetry.

Freed by American troops in 1945, he was later awarded the M.B.E. In 1946 he travelled to India, where he served for a short time as comptroller of the household for Viceroy Lord Wavell (1946–47). Following retirement from the British army, Walker returned briefly to Scotland.

He emigrated to St. Andrews, New Brunswick in 1948, intent on becoming a writer. A prolific author, Walker enjoyed a long and successful career, publishing approximately 100 short stories and 20 books. His novels The Pillar, about a prisoner of war camp, and Digby, a Scottish highlands story, won the Governor General's award for fiction for 1952 and 1953, respectively. Several of his books, including Geordie (1955), were made into motion pictures. Geordie was set in his native Scotland, while Mallabec and Pirate Rock were set in his adopted home province of New Brunswick. Where the High Winds Blow, written following a dogsled adventure in the Canadian North, is considered his most popular Canadian novel. His last book, Lean, Wind, Lean, an autobiography, was published in 1984.

Two other motion pictures, Harry Black (1958) and Amanita Pestilens (1963) were based on Walker's stories. A plan to film Digby in Scotland with Spencer Tracy was aborted.

Apart from his writing career, Walker took a keen interest in community affairs. An active conservationist, he served as president of Sunbury Shores Arts and Nature Centre in St. Andrews and as chair of St. Andrews Centennial Park. Between 1965 and 1991, he sat as a commissioninterner of the Roosevelt Campobello International Park Commission, serving as chair from 1970 to 1972.

His success as a writer and his community involvement won him recognition. In 1955 the University of New Brunswick awarded him an honorary doctor of letters, and in 1987 he was made a Member of the Order of Canada. Walker died at St. Andrews on 5 March 1992, at age 81.

Works

 1963  Amanita Pestilens
 1958 Harry Black and the Tiger
 1955  Wee Geordie
 1957 Sandy was a Soldier's Boy
1949 The Storm and The Silence
1950 Geordie
1952 The Pillar (also released as The Wire 1953)
1953 Digby
1956 Harry Black
1957 Sandy Was a Soldier's Boy
1960 Where the High Winds Blow
1962 Dragon Hill
1962 Storm of Our Journey
1964 Winter of Madness
1965 Mallabec
1966 Come Back, Geordie
1968 Devil's Plunge (also released as Cab-Intersec)
1969 Big Ben
1969 Pirate Rock
1972 The Lord's Pink Ocean
1973 Black Dougal
1976 Ash
1977 Pot of Gold
1984 Lean, Wind, Lean
Source: [Canadian Books and Authors]

References

External links
 title / UNB Archives and Special Collections - David Walker
 Canadian Books and Authors

1911 births
1992 deaths
Canadian male novelists
Scottish novelists
Writers from Dundee
Writers from New Brunswick
People from Saint Andrews, New Brunswick
Governor General's Award-winning fiction writers
Canadian science fiction writers
Scottish science fiction writers
20th-century British novelists
Members of the Order of Canada
Black Watch officers
20th-century Canadian male writers
Canadian Members of the Order of the British Empire
Scottish emigrants to Canada